Fürgangen-Bellwald Talstation railway station, is a railway station in the municipality of Bellwald, in the Swiss canton of Valais. It is an intermediate stop on the  gauge Furka Oberalp line of the Matterhorn Gotthard Bahn and is served by local trains only. The station is adjacent to the valley station of the aerial tramway to Bellwald.

Services 
The following services stop at Fürgangen-Bellwald Talstation:

References

External links 
 
 

Railway stations in the canton of Valais
Matterhorn Gotthard Bahn stations